Ariel Behar and Andrey Golubev were the defending champions but chose not to defend their title.

Francesco Forti and Giulio Zeppieri won the title after defeating Facundo Díaz Acosta and Alexander Merino 6–3, 6–2 in the final.

Seeds

Draw

References

External links
 Main draw

Internazionali di Tennis Città di Todi - Doubles
2021 Doubles